Betul railway station  is a railway station serving Betul town and district of Madhya Pradesh State of India. It is under Nagpur CR railway division of Central Railway Zone of Indian Railways.

It is located at 643 m above sea level and has three platforms. As of 2016, an electrified double broad-gauge railway line exists and at this station, 89 trains stop with 2 originating and 2 terminating trains.

Nagpur Airport is at distance of 155 kilometers.

References

Nagpur CR railway division
Railway stations in Betul district